John Gatyn (fl. 1385–1404) of London and Guildford, Surrey, was an English politician, fishmonger and property owner.

He was a Member (MP) of the Parliament of England for Guildford in 1385, 1386, 1391, 1395, January 1397, 1399, 1401 and January 1404.

References

14th-century births
15th-century deaths
English MPs 1385
English MPs 1386
English MPs 1391
Members of Parliament for Guildford
English MPs 1395
English MPs January 1397
English MPs 1399
English MPs 1401
English MPs January 1404
Fishmongers (people)